The United Kingdom Local Government Act 1988 is an Act of the United Kingdom Parliament. It was famous for its controversial section 28. This section prohibited local authorities from promoting, in a specified category of schools, "the teaching of the acceptability of homosexuality as a pretended family relationship".

The Act did have other effects also, and was rather a mixed bag of changes.  Part I introduced compulsory tendering of contracts for certain types of activities.  Part III allowed housing authorities to provide financial assistance to people living in private property.  Section 38 abolished dog licences.

See also 
Direct service organisation
Section 28

External links

UK Legislation

Commencement Orders

Regulations 

United Kingdom Acts of Parliament 1988
Local government legislation in England and Wales